Assamo, also known as Ina ‘Assamo, It is located around  south of the capital, Djibouti City. The surrounding district is rich in both livestock and fledgeling agriculture. Its population, with the nomadic and semi-nomadic neighborhoods is estimated at 1,211 people.

Overview

During the Middle Ages, Assamo was ruled by the Ifat Sultanate and Adal Sultanate. It later formed a part of the French Somaliland protectorate in the first half of the 20th century. The town has an old fort built on top of a mountain by the French Army. The area also served as an agricultural market for nearby localities.

Assamo lies along a river, near the border with Ethiopia. Nearby towns and villages include Ali Sabieh (24 km), Ali Adde (19 km) and Guisti (18 km).

Demographics

As of 2019, the population of Assamo has been estimated to be 1,211. The city inhabitants belong to various mainly Afro-Asiatic-speaking ethnic groups, with the Issa Somali predominant.

Agriculture
Assamo is a farm land for Djibouti and it is known for its agricultural, and is some where most of Djibouti's crops are produced. Crops grown in the area include oranges, beans, lemon, potatoes, tomatoes, onions, garlic, watermelon, papaya and many other types of fruits and vegetables.

Climate
Assamo features a somewhat rare version of a highland climate with warm, but not hot, summers and cool winters. Due to its  altitude, temperatures are relatively mild for a town located not particularly far from deserts. Characterized by hot and dry summers, and mild to cool winters where most of the precipitation is concentrated (spring and autumn being pleasantly warm transitional seasons).

Assamo has a hot arid climate (BWh) by the Köppen-Geiger system.

Agriculture
Assamo is noted for its agricultural and farming industry. Crops grown in the area include vegetables and fruits. Significant investments have been made in the industry.

References

Ina ‘Assamo

Populated places in Djibouti